Martin Verkerk was the defending champion, but did not participate this year.

Fernando González won the tournament, beating Agustín Calleri in the final, 7–5, 6–3.

Seeds

Draw

Finals

Top half

Bottom half

External links
 Main draw
 Qualifying draw

Dutch Open (tennis)
2005 ATP Tour
2005 Dutch Open (tennis)